A by-election was held for the New South Wales Legislative Assembly electorate of Namoi on 31 July 1890 because of the death of Tom Dangar.

Dates

Candidates
 Charles Collins was a shop owner and businessman from Narrabri who had previously served as the member for Namoi, retiring at the 1887 election and was the first Mayor of Narrabri.
 David Jones was a pastoralist from Walgett, who had previously been a hotel owner and mail contractor in the region.

Both men were supporters of the former member Tom Dangar.

Result

Tom Dangar died.

See also
Electoral results for the district of Namoi
List of New South Wales state by-elections

References

1890 elections in Australia
New South Wales state by-elections
1890s in New South Wales